The following is a list of soap operas that have been broadcast in various countries, including previous and current soap operas. Serials that are currently being broadcast are listed in bold.

Albania
 Njerëz dhe Fate (2002–2003)
 Dhimbja e dashurisë (2008)
 Tingulli i heshtjes (2010)

Argentina

Australia
 Blue Hills (radio, 1949–76)
 Autumn Affair (1958)
 The Story of Peter Grey (1961–1962)
 Homicide (1964–1977)
 Bellbird (1967–1977)
 Motel (1968)
 Division 4 (1969–1976)
 Matlock Police (1971–1975)
 Number 96 (1972–1977)
 Class of '74 / Class of '75 (1974–1975)
 Rush (1974–1976)
 The Box (1974–1977)
 Until Tomorrow (1975)
 Solo One (1976)
 The Young Doctors (1976–1982)
 The Sullivans (1976–1983)
 Glenview High (1977–1978)
 The Restless Years (1977–1981)
 Cop Shop (1977–1984)
 Skyways (1979–1981)
 Prisoner (1979–1986)
 Sons and Daughters (1981–1987)
 A Country Practice (1981–1994)
 Taurus Rising (1982)
 Starting Out (1983)
 Waterloo Station (1983)
 Carson's Law (1983–1984)
 Return to Eden (1983–1986)
 The Flying Doctors / R.F.D.S. (1985–1994)
 Neighbours (1985–present)
 Richmond Hill (1988)
 Home and Away (1988–present)
 The Power, The Passion (1989)
 E Street (1989–1993)
 G. P. (1989–1996)
 Family And Friends (1990)
 Chances (1991–1992)
 Paradise Beach (1993–1994)
 Heartbreak High (1994–1999)
 Blue Heelers (1994–2006)
 Echo Point (1995)
 Pacific Drive (1996–2001)
 Water Rats (1996–2001)
 Wildside (1997–1999)
 Murder Call (1997–2000)
 Breakers (1998–1999)
 Stingers (1998–2004)
 All Saints (1998–2009)
 Above The Law (2000–2001)
 Something in the Air (2000–2002)
 The Secret Life of Us (2001–2005)
 McLeod's Daughters (2001–2009)
 Crash Palace (2001-2002)
 CrashBurn (2003)
 Love My Way (2004–2007)
 headLand (2005–2006)
 Blue Water High (2005–2008)
 Out of the Blue (2008–2009)
 Rush (2008–2011)
 Wentworth (2013–2021)
 Neighbours: Erinsborough High (2019)
 The Heights (2019–present)

Austria
 Kaisermühlen Blues (1992–1999)
 Mitten im 8en (2007)
 Wien – Tag und Nacht (2014)
 Vorstadtweiber (2015–2022)
 Trakehnerblut (2017–present)
 Walking on Sunshine (2019–present)

Belgium
 Emma, telenovela (1 January 2007 – 27 June 2007)
 Familie (30 December 1991 – present)
 Thuis (23 December 1995 – present)
 Vennebos (20 January 1997 – 23 February 1998)
 Wittekerke (31 August 1993 – 26 August 2008)
 Sara (2007–2008) (telenovela)
 LouisLouise (2008–2009) (telenovela)
 David (2009–2010) (telenovela)
 Ella (2010-2011) (telenovela)
 ZOOP (7 April 2004 – June 2006) (Made & aired in the Netherlands for The Netherlands & Flanders)
 Het Huis Anubis (26 September 2006 – 4 December 2009) (Made in Belgium for airings in the Netherlands & Flanders)
 Het Huis Anubis en de Vijf van het Magische Zwaard (2010–2011) (Made in Belgium for airings in the Netherlands & Flanders)

Bolivia
 Amor en tiempo seco ("The love in time of drought")
 Cambas en apuros ("Cambas in difficulties")
 Carmelo Hurtado
 Carmelo Hurtado - El Retorno ("Carmelo Hurtado Returns")
 Chantaje de Amor ("Blackmail of love")
 Coraje Salvaje ("Wild courage")
 La Fundación ("The Foundation")
 Hotelucho ("Poor Hotel")
 Indira
 Luna de Locos ("Moon of the crazies")
 Los Pioneros ("The Pioneers")
 Tardes Antiguas ("Old Afternoon")
 Tierra Adentro ("Inland")
 Las Tres Perfectas Solteras ("The Three Perfect Unmarried Women")
 La Última Expedición ("The Last Expedition")
 Una Vida, Un Destino ("A life, a destiny")
 La Virgen de las Siete Calles ("The Virgin of the Seven Streets")

Bosnia and Herzegovina
 Crna hronika (2004)
 Pečat (2008)

Republika Srpska
 Hotel Balkan (2021)

Brazil

Bulgaria
 Hotel Balgariya  (2004)
 Zabranena Lyubov (October 2008 – 5 May 2011)
 Staklen Dom (2010–11 June 2012)
 Pod Prikritie (2011–June 2016)
 Stolichani v poveche (2011–2019)
 Otkradnat jivot (2016–2021)

Cambodia
 Roschea Chiveth (The Taste of Life) (2004-)

Canada
 11 Cameras (2006)
 49th & Main (2006)
 The Best Years (2007–2009)
 Black Harbour (1996–1999)
 The City (1999–2000)
 Country Joy (1979)
 Degrassi (1980–1992, 2001–2017)
 Edgemont (2001–2005)
 E.N.G. (1988–1994)
 Falcon Beach (2006–2007)
 Family Passions (1993–1994)
 High Hopes (1978)
 Hillside (also known as Fifteen) (1991–1993)
 Loving Friends and Perfect Couples (1983)
 Metropia (2004–2006)
 Moccasin Flats (2003–2008)
 Moment of Truth (1965)
 Mount Royal (1988)
 MVP (2008)
 North of 60 (1992–1997)
 North/South (2006)
 Paradise Falls (2001–2008)
 Riverdale (1997–2000)
 Train 48 (2003–2005)
 Scarlett Hill (1962–1964)
 Strange Paradise (1969–1970)
 Street Legal (1987–1994)
 Time of Your Life (1988–1989)
 Whistler (2006–2007)
 Wild Roses (2008)

Quebec
 Virginie (1996–2010)
 Marilyn (1991–1993)
 La Bonne aventure (1982–1986)
 La Maison Deschênes (1987–1989)
 L'or du temps (1985–1993)
 Watatatow (1991–2005)
 4 et demi...
 Les Belles Histoires des pays d'en haut (1956–1970)
 Le Cœur a ses raisons (2005–2007)
 Les Dames de coeur
 Diva (2010)
 Francoeur
 Jasmine
 Lance et Compte
 La famille Plouffe
 14, rue de Galais
 Les Soeurs Elliot
 Chambres en ville
 Grand Papa
 Les Hauts et les bas de Sophie Paquin
 Au nom de la loi
 Plus belle la vie
 Providence
 Les Soeurs Elliot
 Terra humaine
 Virginie

China
 Xieng Fujie (2000–2002)
 Spirit of Love (2005–2007)
 Dwelling Narrowness (2009)
 Golden Marriage (2010)
 loveo20

Colombia

Croatia
 Zabranjena ljubav (2004–2008)
 Najbolje godine (2009–2011)
 Ruža vjetrova (2011–2013)
 Horvatovi (2015–2016)

Cyprus
 Galatia (2016-2020) - 738 episodes
 Halkina Hronia (2017-2022)-795 episodes
 Anemoi Tou Pathous ("Winds of Passion") (2000–2004)
 I Platia ("The Plaza") (2004–2006)
 Mila Mou ("Talk to Me") (2007–2009)
 Se Fonto Kokkino ("On a Red Background") (2008–2012)-735 episodes
 7 Ouranoi Ke Sinnefa Alites ("7 skies and Bum clouds") (2012-2015)-580 episodes
 Istories Tou Horkou ("Village Stories") (weekly, 1996–2006)-510 episodes
 Manolis Ke Katina ("Manolis and Katina") (weekly, 1994–2007)
 Gia Tin Agapi Sou ("For Your Love") (2008–2009)
 Odos Den Xehno ("Don't Forget Street") (1996)

Czech Republic
 Rodinná pouta (2004–2006)
 Pojišťovna štěstí (2004–2010)
 Ulice (2005–present)
 Ordinace v Růžové zahradě (2005–present)
 Letiště (2006–2007)
 Velmi křehké vztahy (2007–2009)
 Ošklivka Katka (2008–2009)
 Cesty domů (2010–2015)
 Obchoďák (2012)
 Přístav (2015–2017)
 Ohnivý kuře (2016–2018)
 Modrý kód (2017–2020)
 Krejzovi (2018–2019)
 Slunecná (2020-2022)

Denmark
 Hvide Løgne (1998–2000)
 2900 Happiness (2007–2009)

Egypt
 Layali El Helmiya (1992)

Estonia
 Kodu keset linna (2003–2011)
 Õnne 13 (1993–present)
 Helena (2006)
 Elu keset linna (2012–2013)

Finland
 Salatut elämät (1999–present)
 Kotikatu (1995–2012)
  Voitto kotiin (1998)
  Tähtitehdas (1998–1999)
  Ihmeidentekijät/Parhaat vuodet (1996–2002)
  Uusi päivä (2010–2018)

Falkland Islands
 Sea Light (2012–present)

France
 Riviera (1991–1992)
 Sous le soleil (1996–2008)
 Tide of Life (1998–2000)
 Plus Belle La Vie (2004–2022)
 Cinq Soeurs (2008)
 Les Mystères de l'amour (2011–present)
 Cut ! (2013–2019)
 Demain nous appartient (2017–present)
 Un Si Grand Soleil (2018–present)
 Ici tout commence (2020-present)

Germany
 Lindenstraße (8 December 1985−29 March 2020)
 Gute Zeiten, schlechte Zeiten (11 May 1992−present, based on The Restless Years)
 Marienhof (1 October 1992− 15 June 2011)
 Die Fallers – Eine Schwarzwaldfamilie (1994−present)
 Unter uns (1994−present)
 Verbotene Liebe (1995−2015, based on Sons and Daughters)
 Montagskinder (1995−1996)
 Montagsgeschichten (1997)
 Jede Menge Leben (1995−1996)
 So ist das Leben! Die Wagenfelds (1995−1996)
 Alle zusammen – jeder für sich (1996−1997)
 Von Mann zu Mann (1998)
 St. Angela (1997−2005)
 Geliebte Schwestern (1997−1998)
 Die Anrheiner (1998−2011)
 Schloss Einstein (1998−present)
 In aller Freundschaft (1998−present)
 Mallorca – Suche nach dem Paradies (1999−2000)
 Berlin Bohème (2000−2005, 53 episodes)
 Bianca – Wege zum Glück (2004−2005)
 Verliebt in Berlin (2005−2007, telenovela; series 1 based on Yo soy Betty, la fea)
 Sturm der Liebe (2005−present, telenovela)
 Wege zum Glück (2005−2009)
 Sophie – Braut wider Willen (2005-2006, telenovela)
 Schmetterlinge im Bauch (2006−2007)
 Das Geheimnis meines Vaters (2006 + "Best of", telenovela)
 Alles was zählt (2006−present)
 Rote Rosen (2006−present, telenovela)
 Maple Avenue (2007, 60 episodes)
 Dahoam is Dahoam (2007−present)
 112 – Sie retten dein Leben (2008−2009)
 Sonntagsmänner (2008)
 Anna und die Liebe (2008−2012, telenovela)
 Alisa – Folge deinem Herzen (2009−2010, telenovela)
 Das Haus Anubis (2009–2012, remake of Het Huis Anubis)
 Lena - Liebe meines Lebens (2010–2011, telenovela; adaption of Don Juan y su bella dama)
 Hand aufs Herz (2010−2011)
 Verbotene Liebe: Next Generation (2020-Present)

Greece
 İ Lampsi ["The Shine"]  (1991–2005)
 Kalimera Zoe ["Good Morning Life"] (1993–2006)
 Apagoreymeni Agapi ["Forbidden Love"] (1998–2006)
 Filodoxies ["Ambition"] (2002–2006) (799 episodes)
 Vera Sto Dexi ["Wedding Ring on the Right (Hand)"] (2004–2007)
 Erotas ["Love"] (2005–2008)
 Haravgi ["Dawn"]
 Dromoi Paraliloi ["Parallel Roads"]
 Sti skia tou hrimatos ["In Money's Shadow"] (1990–1991)
 To galazio diamanti ["The Blue Diamond"] (1991–1992)
 simphonia ["Agreement" or "Symphony"] (1991–1992)
 İ Dipsa ["The Thirst"] (1990–1991)
 Gia mia thesi ston ilio ["For a Place in the Sun"] (1998–2002)
 Ta mistika tis Edem ["The Secrets of Eden"] (2008–2011)
 "Sto Para Pente "At Five Past"" (2005-2007)

Hungary
 Barátok közt /Among Friends/ (1998–2021)
 Jóban Rosszban /In Good And in Bad Times/ (2005–2022)
 Szomszédok /Neighbours/ (1987–1999)
 Szeress most! / Love Me Now/ (2003–2005)
 7 es Csatorna (1999)
 Bűnök és szerelmek /Sins and loves/ (7 January 2013 – 29 November 2013)

Indonesia

Indika Entertainment
 Al Bahri (TV7, 2003)
 Alung (RCTI, 2002)
 Atas Asyik Bawah Oke (TPI, 2005)
 Belahan Hati (RCTI, 2001)
 Bukan Cinta Sesaat (SCTV, 1999)
 Cinta (RCTI, 1999)
 Cintailah Daku (SCTV, 1998)
 Cinta Dara Kembar (RCTI, 1998)
 Cinta di Awal Tiga Puluh (Indosiar, 1998)
 Cinta Terhalang Tembok (SCTV, 2002)
 Cinta Tak Pernah Salah (RCTI, 2000)
 Cowok Pasar Baru (Trans TV, 2004)
 Di Sini Cinta Pertama Kali Bersemi (Indosiar, 2004)
 Gadis (SCTV, 2003)
 Ilalang Sepanjang Jalan (SCTV, 2002)
 Jangan Cium Gue (Global TV, 2005)
 Jangan Ucapkan Cinta (RCTI, 1999)
 Janji Hati (SCTV, 1999)
 Kabut Sutera Ungu (Indosiar, 2002)
 Kejar Kusnadi (RCTI, 2005)
 Kembang Padang Kelabu (SCTV, 2001)
 Kemilau Kemuning Senja (Indosiar, 2003)
 Ketika Cinta Harus Memilih (Indosiar, 1998)
 Kiri Istri Kanan Mertua (Lativi, 2004)
 Lilin Kecil (SCTV, 2002)
 Mahligai di Atas Pasir (Trans TV, 2002)
 Manusia Bayangan (SCTV, 1999)
 Matahariku (SCTV, 2004)
 Menjemput Impian (SCTV, 2001)
 PadaMu Aku Bersimpuh (RCTI, 2001)
 Penantian 3 Malam (SCTV, 2001)
 Petualangan Si Roy (SCTV, 2002)
 Salon (Lativi, 2002)
 Sebuah Simfoni (SCTV, 2001)
 Selebriti Juga Manusia (Trans TV, 2006)
 Seruni (RCTI, 2000)
 Si Entong (TPI, 2004)
 Surga di Telapak Kaki Ibu (SCTV, 2003)
 Teman Ajaib (TV7, 2005)
 Vanya (Trans TV, 2002)
 Wewe Gombel (RCTI, 2004)
 Zahara Hantu Gaul (TPI, 2003)

MD Entertainment
 Bawang Merah Bawang Putih (2004)
 Cinta Fitri (2007–2010)
 Cinta Bunga (2007–2008)
 Cinta Kirana (2008)
 Suci (2007–2008)
 Tasbih Cinta (2008)
 Melati untuk Marvel (2008–2009)
 Kesetiaan Cinta (2009–2010)
 Gadis (2012)
 Bersama Meraih Mimpi (2013)
 Teddy Boy (2014)
 Cinta Yang Beda (2014)
 Tendangan Si Madun (2014)
 Tendangan Si Madun Returns (2014)
 Disini Ada Tuyul (2014)
 Si Dul (2014)
 Manusia Harimau (2014)
 Cakep-cakep Sakti (2014)
 Alfa (2014)
 Badai (2014)
 Vampire (2014)
 Rahasia Aura (2015)
 Entong Santri Cilik (2015)
 Bromo (2015)
 Malu-Malu Kucing (2015)
 Nathan Dan Nadia (2017)
 Antara Cinta Dan Doa (2017)

Multivision Plus
 Gara-Gara (RCTI,1992–1997) Starring:Lydia Kandouw, Jimmy Gideon, Sion Gideon, Nani Widjaja, Pietrajaya Burnama
 Ada Apa Saja (RCTI,1991–1992) Starring:Nurul Arifin, Rudi Salam, Kiki Fatmala, Fuad Alkhar
 Angin Tak Dapat Membaca (RCTI,1996)
 Mawar Mekar Diantara Duri (Indosiar,1995–1996)
 Selangkah Demi Selangkah (Indosiar,1995–1996)
 Simphony Dua Hati (RCTI,1993–1996)
 Pelangi di Hatiku (RCTI,1991–1992)
 Hati Seluas Samudra (RCTI,1993–1994)
 Untukmu Segalanya 1–2 (RCTI,1994–1996)
 Saling Silang (SCTV,1993-1995) Starring:Debby Sahertian, Ida Kusuma, Eeng Saptadi, Zainal Abidin
 Simphony Dua Hati (RCTI,1995)
 Saat Memberi Saat Menerima (RCTI,1995)
 Bella Vista 1–3 (RCTI,1995–1997)
 Anakku Terlahir Kembali (RCTI,1996–1998)
 Rosanna (SCTV,1996–1997)
 Jinny oh Jinny 1–5 (RCTI,1998–2002) Starring: Diana Pungky, Indra Bruggman, Gracia Indri, etc.
 Janjiku (RCTI,1996–1997)
 Tuyul & Mbak Yul (RCTI,1997–2002) Starring: Jamal Bulat, Onny Syahrial, Slamet Joyo, Ersa Mayori, Dominiq Sanda, etc.
 Jin & Jun (RCTI,1996–2001) Starring: Fuad Baradja, Syahrul Gunawan, Mira Asmara, Misye Arsita, Sukma Ayu, M.Amin
 Abad 21 (Indosiar,1997–1998)
 Asmara (Indosiar,1997–1998)
 Kupu Kupu Kertas (Indosiar,1997–1998)
 Selendang Sutera Biru (Indosiar,1997–1998)
 Istri Pilihan (RCTI,1997–1998)
 Tersayang (SCTV,1998–2000)
 Pertalian (SCTV,1997–1998)
 Bulan Bukan Perawan (RCTI,1997–1998)
 Air Mata Ibu (RCTI,1997–1998)
 Hari Berganti Hari (RCTI,1999)
 Bukan Perempuan Biasa (RCTI,1996–1998)
 Terpesona (SCTV,1998–1999)
 Kemuning (RCTI,1999–2000)
 Hanya Kamu (Indosiar,1999–2000)
 Melati (SCTV,1998–1999)
 Tersanjung 1-6 (Indosiar,1998–2006) Starring: Lulu Tobing, Putri Patricia, Ari Wibowo, Raynold Surbakti, etc.
 Doaku Harapanku 1 (RCTI,1998-1999) Starring: Krisdayanti, Leily Sagita, Dicky Wahyudi, etc.
 Diantara Dua Pilihan (Indosiar,1999)
 Doaku Harapanku 2 (RCTI,1999–2000)
 Dewi Fortuna (SCTV,1999–2001) Starring: Krisdayanti, Bella Saphira, Didi Riyadi, etc.
 Pena Asmara (Indosiar,2000)
 Panji Manusia Millenium (RCTI,1999–2001) Starring:Primus Yustisio, Tia Ivanka, Pangky Suwito, Fendy Pradana, Kiki Widyasari, Anwar Fuady, Diding Boneng, Edy Oglek, etc.
 Terpikat (SCTV,2000–2001)
 Hati Yang Terpilih (RCTI,2000)
 Andini (Demi Cinta) (Indosiar,2001)
 Waktu Terus Berjalan (Indosiar.2001)
 Bidadari 1–3 (RCTI,2000–2005) Starring:Marini Zumarnis, Moudy Wilhelmina, Ayu Azhari, Marshanda, Cecep Reza, Vicky Burky, Sheila Dara Aisha, etc.
 Doa Membawa Berkah 1 (Indosiar,2000)
 Kehormatan 1–3 (Indosiar,2001–2004)
 Wah Cantiknya 1–2 (SCTV,2001–2002)
 Indra Keenam (RCTI,2001–2002)
 Tiga Orang Perempuan (SCTV,2001)
 Mencintaimu (SCTV,2001)
 Kalau Cinta Jangan Marah (SCTV,2001)
 Doa Membawa Berkah 2 (Indosiar,2001)
 Jinny Lagi Jinny Lagi 1–2 (SCTV,2002–2004)
 Tuyul Millenium 1–2 (SCTV,2002–2004)
 Permaisuri Hatiku (RCTI,2002)
 Tunjuk Satu Bintang (SCTV,2002)
 Setetes Embun (RCTI,2002–2003)
 Doa dan Anugerah 1 (Indosiar,2002)
 Julia Jadi Anak Gedongan (RCTI,2003–2004)
 Kalau Cinta Sudah Bicara 1 (SCTV,2003)
 Norak Tapi Beken (RCTI,2003–2004)
 Kalau Cinta Sudah Bicara 2 (SCTV,2003–2004)
 Doa dan Anugerah 2 (Indosiar,2003)
 Si Cecep (SCTV,2004–2005)
 Seandainya (Indosiar,2004–2005)
 Bule Masuk Kampung 1 (Indosiar,2004)
 Titipan Ilahi (Indosiar,2004–2006)
 Adilkah (Indosiar,2004–2005)
 Jangan Behenti Mencintaiku (SCTV,2004–2006)
 Untung Ada Jinny (SCTV,2004–2005)
 Bule Masuk Kampung 2 (Indosiar,2004–2005)
 Bule Masuk Kampung 3 (Indosiar,2005)
 Dina Dini dalam dekapan Doni (Indosiar,2006)
 Cinta Indah 1–2 (SCTV,2007–2008)
 Suami-Suami Takut Istri (Trans TV,2007)
 Abdel & Temon Bukan Superstar (Global TV,2008–2009)
 Bukan Abdel & Temon Biasa (Global TV,2009)
 Nurhaliza (Indosiar,2010)
 Beningnya Cinta (Indosiar,2010)
 Islam KTP (SCTV,2010–2011)
 Istiqomah (SCTV,2011)
 Khadijah dan Khalifah (Indosiar,2011)
 Hijrah Cinta The Series (2014)
 Cahaya Cinta (ANTV,2017)
 I-KTP (ANTV,2017)
 Nadin (ANTV,2017)
 Cinta di Pangkuan Himalaya (ANTV,2017)
 Kecil-Kecil Mikir Jadi Manten (ANTV,2017)
 Kekasih Dunia Akhirat (ANTV,2017)
 Ada Si Manis di Jembatan (ANTV,2017)
 Wanita Perindu Surga (ANTV,2017-2018)
 Nabil & Nabila (ANTV,2017)
 Ummi (ANTV,2018)
 Oh Mama Oh Papa (ANTV,2018)
 Karma The Series (ANTV,2018)
 Roy Kiyoshi Anak Indigo (ANTV,2018)
 Semua Indah Karena Cinta (RCTI,2018)
 Tangis Kehidupan Wanita (ANTV,2018)
 Cinta Tiada Akhir (ANTV,2018)
 Cinta Sebening Embun (RCTI,2019)
 Pelangi di Matamu (RCTI,2019)
 Aisyah (ANTV,2019)
 Ratapan Ibu Tiri (ANTV,2020)
 Kasih Sepanjang Masa (RCTI,2020)
 Cinta yang Abadi (ANTV,2020)
 Jalan Batin Ningsih Tinampi (ANTV,2020–present)

SinemArt
 Ada Apa Dengan Cinta? (RCTI,2003–2005)
 Kisah Sedih di Hari Minggu (RCTI,2004–2005)
 Liontin (RCTI,2005–2006)
 Pintu Hidayah (RCTI,2005–2007)
 Maha Kasih (RCTI,2006)
 Wulan (RCTI,2006–2007)
 Intan (RCTI,2006–2007)
 Ketika Cinta Bertasbih (Ramadhan Special) (RCTI,2010)
 Putri Yang Ditukar (RCTI,2010–2011)
 Kemilau Cinta Kamila (RCTI,2010–2011)
 Ketika Cinta Bertasbih (Meraih Ridho Ilahi) (RCTI,2011)
 Tukang Bubur Naik Haji: The Series (RCTI,2012–2017)
 Tendangan dari Langit: The Series (RCTI,2013)
 Catatan Hati Seorang Istri (RCTI,2014–July 2016)
 7 Manusia Harimau (RCTI,2014–2016)
 Anak Jalanan (RCTI,2015–2017)
 Anugerah Cinta (RCTI,2016–2017)
 Anak Langit (SCTV,2017–present)
 Orang Ketiga (SCTV,2018)
 Cinta Anak Muda (SCTV,2019)
 Samudra Cinta (SCTV,2019–present)
 Jangan Panggil Gue Pak Haji (SCTV,2019)
 Kisah Cinta Anak Tiri (SCTV,2020–present)

Republic of Ireland
 Fair City (1989–present)
 Ros na Rún (1996–present)
 Red Rock (2015–2019)
 Glenroe (1983–2001)
 The Riordans (1965–1979)
 Bracken (1978–1982)
 Tolka Row (1964–1968)
 The Kennedys of Castleross (1955–1973)

Israel
 Ramat Aviv Gimmel (1995–2000)
 Kesef Catlanie (1996–1999)
 Zahav shel shotim (1994–1995)
 Cafe Paris (1996–1998)
 Ha-Mosad (1996–1997)
 Tik Denver (1998)
 Laga'at BaOsher (2001)
 Lehayey HaAhava (2002)
 City Tower (2002)
 Mischak HaHaim (2003)
 Ahava Me'ever LaPina (2003–2005)
 Ha-Chatzer (2003)
 Michaela (2004)
 HaShir Shelanu (2004–2007)
 Telenovela Ba'am (2005)
 HaAlufa (2006–2007, 2009)
 Bubot (2007–2008)
 Hasufim (2008–2009)
 Neshot Htayasim (2009)
 Tichon HaShir Shelanu (2009-2010)

Italy
 Agrodolce (2008–2009)
 CentoVetrine (2001–2016)
 Cuori rubati (2002–2003)
 Il paradiso delle signore (2015–present)
 Incantesimo (1997–2008)
 In nome della famiglia (1995)
 Ricominciare (2000–2001)
 Senza Fine (1992–1994)
 Sottocasa (2006)
 Un posto al sole (1996–present)
 Vivere (1999–2008)

Jamaica
 Royal Palm Estate (1994–present)
 The Blackburns (2009–present)
 Lime Tree Lane (1970–1997)

Japan
 Be Nice to People
 Cheap Love
 Food Fight
 Golden Bowl
 Good Luck!! (1996, 2003)
 GTO (Great Teacher Onizuka)
 Home&Away
 Ko-Ko-Ro
 Love Generation
 Otousan
 Pride
 Refrain
 Water Boys
 Wedding Planner

Kazakhstan
 Perekryostok (Crossroads) (1996–2000)
 Sarancha (Locust) (2001–2003)
 Zhanym (My Love) (2010–2012)
 Perekryostok v Astane (Crossroads in Astana) (2014–present)

Lebanon
 when the soil cries (2012)
 the crazy love
 ameliah
 and the sun shone
 the returner 2
 The streets of humiliation
 The resurrection of guns
 Root
 goodbye
 Ruby
 ajyal
 love duet
 luna
 sarah
 madame carmen
 casanova
 kinda
 the mask
 runaway
 beautiful and liar
 cotton candy
 teenagers
 the returner
 when the soil cries
 memory
 the first time
 Nada the advocate
 the fault of my life
 the widow and the devil
 the old love
 the last news
 the last night
 between Beirut and Dubai
 the fountains
 family
 knight of dreams
 torn roses
 little sins
  the despot
 era of women
 the prisoner
 my son
 the stranger
 without memory
 beb idris
 the winners
 zahia said that
 Inn
 teacher's son
 flying eagles
 story of Amel
 my cousins my daughter and I
 my wife and I
 my wife my son and I
 Mariana
 Abdo and Abdo
 a man from the past
 the flower of the autumn
 doctor hala
 al sharoura
  dream of may
 the corner
 nidal
 jamile and jamilee
 neighbors
 sign 13
 broken bird
 something powerful
 chance
 the falling of a woman
 a love step
 forbidden love
 to yara
 a beat of heart
 spot of love
 like a lie
 she and she
 cords in the air
 scenario
 approximately a love story
 from all my heart
 the team
 life is drama

Lithuania
 Nekviesta meilė (2007–2010)
 Moterys meluoja geriau (2008–present)
 Giminės (1993) (2007)
 Broliai (2008–2009)

Malaysia
 Fajar Di Bumi Permata (1973–1981)
 Opah (1982–2000; 2013–2014)
 Wardah (1990–1993)
 City of the Rich (1996–1997)
 Idaman (1997–2004)-312 episodes
 Manjalara (2007–2008)
 Pelajaran Hidup (2011)
 Hanya Cinta (2011)

Mexico

Morocco
 Komar Soltane (2005–2006)

Nigeria
 Dadin kowa
 Kwana casa'in
 Gidan badamasi
 Labarin a.
 Tinsel (2008-present)-3255 episode

Netherlands
 Bon Bini Beach  (2002–2003)
 Foreign Affairs (1992)
 Glazen huis, Het (4 September 2004 – 4 February 2005)
 ''Goede tijden, slechte tijden (GTST) (1 October 1990–present)
 Goudkust (11 March 1996 – 28 February 2001)
 Het Huis Anubis (26 September 2006 – 4 December 2009)
 Lotte (26 February 2006 – 9 April 2007)
 Malaika (25 March 2013 – 31 May 2013)
 Nieuwe Tijden (4 July 2016 – 2018)
 Onderweg Naar Morgen (3 January 1994 – 14 May 2010)
 Oude Noorden, Het (1993)
 Rijk & Ongelukkig (12 January 2005 – 2005)
 Spangas (7 September 2007 – present)
 StartUp (6 January 2014 – 18 April 2014)
 Topstars (26 October 2004 – 29 December 2006)
 Westenwind (1999–2003)
 ZOOP (7 April 2004 – June 2006)
 Van Jonge Leu en Oale Groond (2 October 2005 – 2009)
 Het Huis Anubis en de Vijf van het Magische Zwaard (17 March 2010 – 2011)

New Zealand
 City Life (1996–1998)
 Close to Home (1975–1983)
 Country GP (1984–1985)
 Gloss (1987–1989)
 Shark in the Park (1989–1992)
 Homeward Bound (1992)
 Jackson's Wharf (1999–2001)
 Shortland Street (1992–present)
 The Tribe (1999–2003)
 Korero Mai (2000–present; Maori soap opera)
 Pukemanu (1971–1972)
 Whanau (Learning Maori soap opera)
 You Me Now (2010–present; Radio New Zealand soap)

Norway
 Familiesagaen De syv søstre (1996–2000)
 Hotel Cæsar (1998–2017)
 Offshore (1996–1999)
 Venner og Fiender (1996–2000)

Philippines

Poland
 Adam i Ewa (2000–2001)
 Apetyt na życie (2010)
 Barwy szczęścia (2007–present)
 BrzydUla (2008–2009)
 Czułość i kłamstwa (1999–2000)
 Dwie strony medalu (2007)
 Egzamin z życia (2005–2008)
 Galeria (2012)
 Klan (1997–present)
 Kopciuszek (2006–2007)
 Linia życia (2011)
 M jak miłość (2000–present)
 Majka (2010)
 Marzenia do spełnienia (2001–2002)
 Miasteczko (2000–2001)
 Na dobre i na złe (1999–present)
 Na Wspólnej (2003–present)
 Pensjonat pod Różą (2004–2006)
 Pierwsza miłość (2004–present)
 Plebania (2000–2012)
 Prosto w serce (2010–2011)
 Radio Romans (1994–1995)
 Rezydencja (2011–2012)
 Samo Życie (2002–2010)
 Tylko miłość (2007–2009)
 W labiryncie (1988–1991)
 Warto kochać (2005–2007)
 Więzy krwi (2001)
 Wszystko przed nami (2012–2013)
 Złotopolscy (1998–2010)
 Życie jak poker (1998–1999)

Portugal

Puerto Rico
 Alejandra
 Coralito
 Cristina Bazán
 De qué color es el amor
 Dueña y Señora
 El Idolo
 Julieta, Una Historia de Amor
 Karina Montaner
 La Isla
 La Otra
 La Sombra de Belinda
 La Verdadera Eva
 Laura Guzmán, Culpable
 Milly
 Natalia
 Pacto de amor
 Preciosa
 Rojo Verano
 Tanairí
 Vida
 Yara Prohibida
 Yo Sé Que Mentía (1982)

Romania

Media Pro Pictures
 Numai iubirea (2004–2005), (Only the Love)
 Păcatele Evei (2005–2006), (The Sins of Eva) pacateleevei.ro
 Lacrimi de iubire (2005–2006), (Tears of Love) lacrimideiubire.ro
 Daria, iubirea mea (2006–2007), (Daria, My Love) dariaiubireamea.ro
 Iubire ca în filme (2006–2007), (Love like in the Movies) iubirecainfilme.ro
 Inima de ţigan (2006–2007), (The Gypsy's Heart)
 Cu un pas înainte (2006–2007,2007,2007–2008), (With a Step Further)
 Regina (TBA maybe in autumn 2008–TBA maybe in 2009), ("Regina" can be a name of a woman or the Romanian equivalent for "Queen")
 La Bloc (2004–2008), (At the Apartment House)
 Iubire și onoare (2010-2011), (In the Name of Honour)

Intact Production & La Dolce Vita Production
 Secretul Mariei (2005–2006), (The Secret of Maria) secretulmariei.ro
 Vocea Inimii (2006–2007), (Voice of the Heart) voceainimii.ro
 Clanul Spranceana (2007–2008), (The Spranceana Klan)
 TBA (maybe 2008–2009 TBA), (TBA)
 Emisiuni (2006–2007)

Slovakia
 Medzi nami (2005–2006)
 Ordinácia v ružovej záhrade (2007–2012)
 Panelák (2008–2015)
 Búrlivé víno (2012–present)
 Chlapi neplacú (2013–2015)

Slovenia
 Strasti ("Passions") (2008)
 Ena žlahtna štorija ("A Noble Story") (2015–2017)
 Usodno vino ("Fatal Wine") (2015–2017)
 'Ena žlahtna štorija: Mlada ljubezen' ("A Noble Story: Young Love") (spin-off of "A Noble Story")
 Reka ljubezni ("A River of Love")

Serbia
 Ceo život za godinu dana (1971–1974)
 Gore-dole (1996–1997)
 Lisice (2002–2003)
 Hotel sa 7 zvezdica (2002–2003)
 Selo gori a baba se češlja (2006–2016)
 Ranjeni orao (2008–2009)
 Greh njene majke (2009)
 Nepobedivo srce (2010–2011)
 Žene sa Dedinja (2012–2015)
 Tajne (2012–2014)
 Vojna akademija (2012–2019)
 Samac u braku (2013)
 Sudbine (2013–2015)
 Sinđelići (2013–2019)
 Urgentni centar (2014–present)
 Jedne letnje noći (2015)
 Sumnjiva lica (2016–2017)
 Istine i laži (2017–2019)
 Crveni mesec (2019-2020)
 Igra sudbine (2020-present)
 Hotel Balkan (2020-2021)
 Jugoslovenka (2021)
 Kolo sreće (2021-2022)
 Dinastija (2021)
 Zaustavi vreme (2021)

South Africa
 Egoli: Place of Gold (1992–2010)
 Isidingo (1998–2020)
 7de Laan (2000–present)
 Generations  (1993–2014)
 Generations: The Legacy (2014-present, remake of the original Generations)
 Backstage  (2000–2007)
 Scandal! (2005–present)
 Muvhango (1997–present)
 Villa Rosa (2004–2016)
 Binnelanders (2005–present)
 Rhythm City (2007–2021)
 The Wild (2011–2013)
 Suidooster (2015–present)
 Getroud Met Rugby - Die Sepie (2015–2022)
 Imbewu: The Seed (2018-present)
 Skeem Saam (2011-present)
 Uzalo (2015-Present)
 The Queen (2016-present)
 The River (2018-present)
 Gomora (2020-present)

South Korea
 Alone in Love (2006)
 Summer Scent (2003)
 Winter Sonata (2002)
 Moraeshigae (Hourglass/Sandglass) (1995)
 Dae Jang Geum (A Jewel in the Palace) - also popular in Hong Kong (대장금)
 Hur Jun (also called "The Way of Medicine")
 Damo (다모)
 Sea God, also known as Emperor of the Sea Bulmyeolei Yi Sun Shin (The Immortal Yi Soon-Shin)
 All In (올인)
 Full House Hotelier (호텔리어)
 I'm Sorry, I Love You The Third Republic Love Story in Harvard My Name is Kim Sam Soon (내이름은 김삼순)
 Sad Sonata (슬픈연가) City Hunter
 Faith
 Sangdo, Merchants of Joseon (상도)

Spain
 Goenkale (1994–2015)
 Arrayán (2001–2013)
 Calle nueva (1997-2000)
 Al Salir De Clase (1997–2002)
 La Verdad de Laura (2002)
 Géminis, Venganza de amor (2002-2003)
 Plaza Alta (1998–2000)
 Mareas Vivas (1998–2002)
 Herederos (2007–2009)
 Yo soy Bea (2006–2009)
 Amar en tiempos revueltos (2005–2012)
 Amar es para siempre (2013–present; sequel series of Amar en tiempos revueltos)
 El secreto de Puente Viejo (2011–2020)
 Bandolera (2011–2013)
 Acacias 38 (2015–2021)
 Seis hermanas (2015–2017)
 Servir y proteger (2017–present)
 Poble Nou (1994–1994)
 Secrets De Família (1995)
 Nissaga de Poder (1996–1998)
 Laberint d'ombres (1998–2000)
 El Cor de la Ciutat (2000–2009)
 Temps de Silenci (2001–2002)
 Ventdelplà (2005–2010)

Sri Lanka
 Andara Veta Kopi Kade (1987–present)
 Batti Paba Muthu Kirilli Amaa Malee Deweni Inima (2017-present)
 Sangeethe (2019-present)

Sweden
 Hem till byn (1971–2006)
 Rederiet (1992–2002)
 Vänner och Fiender (1996–2000)
 Nya tider (1999–2003)
 Skilda världar (1996–2001)
 Vita lögner (1997–2002)
 Tre kronor (1994–1999)
 Varuhuset (1987–1989)
 Hotel Seger (2000–2001)
 Andra Avenyn (2007–2010)

Switzerland
 Lüthi und Blanc (1999–2007)

Tamil Language (India, Singapore, Sri Lanka)

 Anandham (ஆனந்தம்) (2003–2009)
 Andal Alagar (ஆண்டாள் அழகர்) (2014–2016)
 Annamalai (அண்ணாமலை) (2002–2005)
 Azhagi (அழகி) (2011–2016)
 Bommalattam (பொம்மலாட்டம்) (2012–2016)
 Chellamay (செல்லமே) (2009–2013)
 Chithi (சித்தி) (1999-2001)
 Deivam thandha Veedu (தெய்வம் தந்த வீடு) (2013–2017)
 Deivamagal (தெய்வமகள்) (2013–2018)
 Idhayam (இதயம்) (2009–2012)
 Kalki (கல்கி) (2004–2006)
 Kana Kaanum Kaalangal(கனா காணும் காலங்கள்) (2006–2009)
 Nandini (நந்தினி) (2017–2020)
 Office (ஆபீஸ்) (2013–2015)
 Saravanan Meenatchi (Season 1) (சரவணன் மீனாட்சி) (2011–2013)
 Tamil Kadavul Murugan (தமிழ் கடவுள் முருகன்) (2017–2018)
 Thalayanai Pookal (தலையணைப் பூக்கள்) (2016–2018)
 Thangam (தங்கம்) (2009–2013)
 Uravugal (உறவுகள்) (2009–2012)
 Vallamai Tharayo (வல்லமை தாராயோ) (2016)
 Yaaradi Nee Mohini (யாரடி நீ மோகினி) (2017–2021)

Turkey
 Cennetin Sırları (2011)
 Derin Sular (2011)
 Ferhunde Hanımlar (1993–1999)
 Unutma Beni (2008–2016)
 Deniz Yıldızı (2009–2015)
 Dinle Sevgili (2011–2012)
 İki Dünya Arasında (2012–2015)
 Beni Affet (2012–2018)
 Şeytanın Gözyaşları (1998)
 Fırtınalı Aşk (2007)
 Aşkın Bedeli  (2013–2015)
 Kara Melek (1997–2000)
 Rüzgarlı Sokak (2013)
 Elif (2014–2019)
 Kara Sevda (2015-2017)
  Aşk Laftan Anlamaz  (2016-2017)

United Kingdom
 Front Line Family (1941–1948)
 Mrs Dale's Diary (1948–1969)
 The Archers (1951–present)
 The Appleyards (1952–1957)
 The Grove Family (1954–1957, 1991)
 Emergency – Ward 10 (1957–1967)
 Coronation Street (1960–present)
 Compact (1962–1965)
 Dr Finlay's Casebook (1962–1971)
 Crossroads (1964–1988, 2001–2003)
 199 Park Lane (1965)
 United! (1965–1967)
 The Newcomers (1965–1969)
 Weavers Green (1966)
 Market in Honey Lane (1967–1969)
 High Living (1968–1971)
 Waggoners' Walk (1969–1980)
 General Hospital (1972–1979)
 Emmerdale (1972–present)
 Crown Court (1973–1984)
 Pobol y Cwm (1974–present)
 Angels (1975–1983)
 Garnock Way (1976–1979)
 The Cedar Tree (1976–1979)
 Take the High Road (1980–2003)
 Together (1980–1981)
 Triangle (1981–1983)
 Brookside (1982–2003)
 The Bill (1983–2010)
 Gems (1985–1988)
 Albion Market (1985–1986)
 The Practice (1985–1986)
 Howards' Way (1985–1990)
 EastEnders (1985–present)
 Casualty (1986–present)
 Citizens (1987–1991)
 Park Avenue (1988–1992)
 Jupiter Moon (1990, 1996)
 Families (1990–1993)
 Family Pride (1991–1992)
 Eldorado (1992–1993)
 Heartbeat (1992–2010)
 Machair (1992–1998)
 Revelations (1994–1996)
 Castles (1995)
 Rownd a Rownd (1995–present)
 Hollyoaks (1995–present)
 Canary Wharf (1996)
 Springhill (1996–1997)
 London Bridge (1996–1999)
 Quayside (1997)
 Family Affairs (1997–2005)
 Dream Team (1997–2007)
 Westway (1997–2005)
 Holby City (1999–2022)
 Doctors (2000–present)
 Night and Day (2001–2003)
 Footballers' Wives (2002-2006)
 Chalkhill Lives (2002-2009)
 River City (2002–present)
 Mile High (2003-2005)
 Silver Street (2004–2010)
 Hollyoaks: In The City (2006)
 The Chase (2006-2007)
 Hotel Babylon (2006-2009)
 Waterloo Road  (2006–2015)
 HolbyBlue (2007–2008)
 Echo Beach (2008)
 The Royal Today (2008)

United States
 Radio serials 
 The Goldbergs (1929–1950)
 Clara, Lu, and Em (1930–1942)
 Painted Dreams (1930–1943)
 Myrt and Marge (1931–1942)
 Judy and Jane (1932–1935)
 Just Plain Bill (1932–1955)
 One Man's Family (1932–1959)
 Pepper Young's Family (1932–1959)
 Today's Children (1933–1938, 1943–1950)
 Ma Perkins (1933–1960)
 The Romance of Helen Trent (1933–1960)
 Girl Alone (1935–1941)
 The O'Neills (1935–1943)
 Bachelor's Children (1935–1946)
 Backstage Wife (1935–1959)
 Dan Harding's Wife (1936–1938)
 Second Husband (1936–1946)
 David Harum (1936–1950)
 Big Sister (1936–1952)
 Our Gal Sunday (1936–1959)
 Kitty Keene, Incorporated (1937–1941)
 Aunt Jenny's Real Life Stories (1937–1955)
 Lorenzo Jones (1937–1955)
 Stella Dallas (1937–1955)
 The Guiding Light (1937–1956)
 Jane Arden (1938–1939)
 Your Family and Mine (1938–1940)
 Valiant Lady (1938–1952)
 Life Can Be Beautiful (1938–1954)
 Young Widder Brown (1938–1956)
 When a Girl Marries (1939–1957)
 Young Doctor Malone (1939–1960)
 Adopted Daughter (1939–1941)
 Against the Storm (1939–1952)
 Amanda of Honeymoon Hill (1940–1946)
 Portia Faces Life (1940–1953)
 Lonely Women (1942–1943)
 Perry Mason (1943–1955)
 Rosemary (1944–1955)
 Aunt Mary (1944–1961)
 The Second Mrs. Burton (1946–1960)
 The Brighter Day (1948–1956)

 Daytime television 
 These Are My Children (1949)
 A Woman to Remember (1949)
 Hawkins Falls (1950–1955)
 The First Hundred Years (1950–1952)
 Miss Susan (1951)
 Love of Life (1951–1980)
 Search for Tomorrow (1951–1986)
 Guiding Light (1952–2009)
 Three Steps to Heaven (1953–1954)
 Valiant Lady (1953–1957)
 First Love (1954–1955)
 One Man's Family (1954–1955)
 Portia Faces Life (1954–1955)
 Golden Windows (1954–1955)
 The Brighter Day (1954–1962)
 The Secret Storm (1954–1974)
 As the World Turns (1956–2010)
 The Edge of Night (1956–1984)
 From These Roots (1958–1961)
 Young Doctor Malone (1958–1963)
 The Clear Horizon (1960–1962)
 Our Five Daughters (1962)
 The Doctors (1963–1982)
 General Hospital (1963–present)
 A Flame in the Wind (1964–1965)
 The Young Marrieds (1964–1966)
 Peyton Place (1964–1969)
 Another World (1964–1999)
 Days of Our Lives (1965–present)
 Morning Star (1965–1966)
 Paradise Bay (1965–1966)
 Never Too Young (1965–1966)
 The Nurses (1965–1967)
 Dark Shadows (1966–1971)
 Love Is a Many Splendored Thing (1967–1973)
 Hidden Faces (1968–1969)
 One Life to Live (1968–2012)
 Bright Promise (1969–1972)
 Where the Heart Is (1969–1973)
 The Best of Everything (1970)
 Bird of the Iron Feather (1970)"Remembering a public TV drama that delved into lives of black Chicagoans" Sonja D. Williams, June 14, 2016, Current.org
 A World Apart (1970–1971)
 Somerset (1970–1976)
 All My Children (1970–2011)
 The Best of Everything (1970)
 Return to Peyton Place (1972–1974)
 The Young and the Restless (1973–present)
 How to Survive a Marriage (1974–1975)
 Ryan's Hope (1975–1989)
 Lovers and Friends/For Richer, For Poorer (1977–1978)
 Texas (1980–1982)
 Another Life (1981–1984)
 Capitol (1982–1987)
 The Catlins (1983–1985)
 Loving (1983–1995)
 Rituals (1984–1985)
 Santa Barbara (1984–1993)
 The Bold and the Beautiful (1987–present)
 Generations (1989–1991)
 Tribes (1990)
 Swans Crossing (1992)
 The City (1995–1997)
 Port Charles (1997–2003)
 Sunset Beach (1997–1999)
 Passions (1999–2008)

 Prime time television 
 Faraway Hill (1946)
 Highway to the Stars (1947)
 One Man's Family (1949–1952)
 Peyton Place (1964–1969)
 Paradise Bay (1965–1966)
 Harold Robbins' The Survivors (1969–1970)
 Executive Suite (1976–1977)
 Lovers and Friends (1977–1978)
 Mary Hartman, Mary Hartman (1977–1978)
 Dallas (1978–1991, 2012–2014)
 Knots Landing (1979–1993)
 Secrets of Midland Heights (1980–1981)
 Flamingo Road (1980–1982)
 Dynasty (1981–1989, 2017–2022)
 Falcon Crest (1981–1990)
 Bare Essence (1983)
 The Hamptons (1983)
 Hotel (1983–1988)
 Paper Dolls (1984)
 Berrenger's (1985)
 The Colbys (1985–1987)
 Beverly Hills, 90210 (1990–2000)
 2000 Malibu Road (1992)
 Melrose Place (1992–1999, 2009–2010)
 Winnetka Road (1994)
 Models Inc. (1994–1995)
 The Monroes (1995)
 Central Park West (1995–1996)
 Malibu Shores (1996)
 Savannah (1996–1997)
 Pacific Palisades (1997)
 Undressed (1999–2002)
 Titans (2000)
 Pasadena (2001)
 Spyder Games (2001)
 North Shore (2004–2005)
 Desperate Housewives (2004–2012)
 Sex, Love & Secrets (2005)
 Dante's Cove (2005–2007)
 Point Pleasant (2005)
 General Hospital: Night Shift (2007–2008)
 Revenge (2011–2015)
 Nashville (2012–2018)
 Deception (2013)
 Devious Maids (2013–2016)
 The Haves and the Have Nots (2013–2021)
 Hit the Floor (2013–2018)
 Mistresses (2013–2016)
 If Loving You Is Wrong (2014–2020)
 Blood & Oil (2015)
 Empire (2015–2020)
 The Royals (2015–2018)
 Greenleaf (2016–2020)
 Daytime Divas (2017)
 Ambitions (2019)
 Grand Hotel (2019)
 Tiny Pretty Things (2020)

 Web series 
 All My Children (2013)
 Anacostia (2009–Present)
 As the Cookie Crumbles (2008)
 The Bay (2010–Present)
 Beacon Hill (2014-2015)
 The Cavanaughs (2010–2011)
 DeVanity (2011–2014)
 East Los High (2013–2017)
 EastSiders (2012–2020)
 Miss Behave (2010–2012)
 One Life to Live (2013)
 Ragged Isle (2011–2014)
 River Ridge (2012)
 The Spot  (1995–1997)
 Tainted Dreams (2013–2017)
 They Go On (1997)
 Venice: The Series (2009–2021)
 What If... (2010)
 Winterthorne (2015)
 Youthful Daze (2012–present)

Uruguay
 Las novias de Travolta (2009)
 Porque te quiero así (2011–2012)
 Dance! (Soap Opera)'' (2011)

Venezuela

See also
 List of telenovelas

References

List
Lists of television series by genre
Soap opera lists